Harakiri for the Sky is an Austrian post-black metal band formed in Salzburg and Vienna in 2011 by vocalist JJ (Michael V. Wahntraum) and multi-instrumentalist Matthias Sollak, formerly of black metal band Bifröst. They have released five studio albums – Harakiri for the Sky (2012), Aokigahara (2014), III: Trauma (2016), Arson (2018) and Mӕre (2021) – via German label AOP Records.

The band toured alongside Der Weg einer Freiheit and The Great Old Ones in March 2016 and played Summer Breeze Open Air later that year. For live performances, JJ and Sollak are joined by bassist Thomas Dornig, drummer Mischa Bruemmer and guitarist Marrok. In 2017, they were nominated for the "Hard & Heavy" category of the Amadeus Austrian Music Awards.

Members
 Matthias "MS" Sollak – guitars, bass, drums (2011–present)
 Michael "JJ" V. Wahntraum – vocals (2011–present)

Touring musicians
Current
 Thomas Dornig – bass (2012–present)
 Marrok – guitar, backing vocals (2012–present)
 Mischa Bruemmer – drums (2013–present)

Former
 Morbus J – drums (2012–2013)
 Thomas "T. Martyr" Leitner – drums (2014)

Discography
Studio albums

Box sets
 Wooden Tape Box (2015)

Singles
 "Calling the Rain" (2016)
 "Tomb Omnia" (2017)
 "You Are the Scars" (2017)
 "Heroin Waltz" (2018)
 "I, Pallbearer" (2020)"
 "Sing for the Damage We've Done" (2020)
 "And Oceans Between Us" (2020)
 "I'm All About the Dusk" (2021)
 "Song to Say Goodbye" (2021)

Music videos
 "My Bones to the Sea" (2014)
 "The Traces We Leave" (2016)
 "Heroin Waltz" (2018)
 "I, Pallbearer" (2020) 
"Sing for the Damage We've Done" (2020)
"I'm All About the Dusk" (2020)
 "Us Against December Skies" (2021)
 "Mad World (Tears for Fears Cover)" (2022)

References

External links

Austrian black metal musical groups
Post-hardcore groups
Post-metal musical groups
Austrian heavy metal musical groups
Austrian punk rock groups
Musical groups established in 2011
2011 establishments in Austria
Musical groups from Vienna
Musicians from Salzburg
Austrian musical duos